Parmotrema zicoi is a species of saxicolous lichen in the family Parmeliaceae. Found in Brazil, it was introduced as new to science in 2002.

Taxonomy

The specific epithet zicoi honours the priest Tobias Zico, who, as a former administrator for the Parque Natural do Caraça, promoted the "preservation of a most important type locality for numerous lichens, animals, and plants in Brazil".

Description
The margins of the lobes have simple cilia that are up to 1 mm long. The cortex contains atranorin, while the medulla contains protocetraric acid. Occasionally, the medullary K spot test reaction is positive, producing a very light yellow colour that indicates the presence of traces of atranorin in the upper part of the medulla near the cortex. P. zicoi has short bacilliform-shaped conidia that are less than 5 μm long. The lichen does not produce any form of vegetative propagation or pustules.

See also
List of Parmotrema species

References

zicoi
Lichen species
Lichens described in 2002
Lichens of Brazil